The National Society of Industries is a private organization that brings together the business community of the Peruvian manufacturing industry.

The society was promoted by Nicolás de Piérola, President of Peru. 

It was funded on 13 June 1896. The organization is headquartered in Lima and has regional branches in the cities of Arequipa, Trujillo, Huancayo, and Chiclayo. 

The group is contains 58 committees that relate to various sectors of the manufacturing industry, including committees that relate to food and beverage, chemicals, paper, telecommunications, metal, plastic, textile, and footwear, among others.

The first president of the society was Juan Revoredo.

Presidents 
The presidents of the society are elected by its members and have been as follows: 

 Juan Revoredo Cruces (1896–1899)
 Federico Pezet y Tirado (1899–1901)
 José Payán y Reyna (1901–1915)
 Gio Balta Isola (1915–1924)
 Ricardo Tizón y Bueno (1924–1925)
 Reginald Ashton (1925–1926)
 Ricardo Tizón y Bueno (1926–1929)
 Jesse Robert Wakeham (1929–1930)
 Agusto Maurer (1930–1949)
 Carlos Díaz-Ufano (1950–1958)
 Alfonso Montero Muelle (1958–1961)
 Pablo Carriquiry Maurer (1961–1963)
 Santiago Gerbolini Isola (1963–1965)
 Jorge Ferrand Inurritegui (1965–1967)
 Gonzalo Raffo Uzátegui (1967–1969)
 Eduardo Dibós Chappuis (1969–1970)
 Alfredo Ostoja Diminich (1970–1972)
 Raymundo Duharte Castre (1972–1973)
 Juan Tudela Bentín (1973–1977)
 José Antonio Aguirre Roca (1977–1979)
 Alfredo Ferrand (1979–1981)
 Ernesto Lanatta Piaggio (1981–1983)
 Carlos Verme Katz (1983–1985)
 Miguel Vega Alvear (1985–1987)
 Gabriel Lanatta Piaggio (1987–1989)
 Salvador Majluf Poza (1989–1991)
 Luis Vega Monteferri (1991–1993)
 Ricardo Márquez Flores (1993–1994)
 Roberto Niesta Brero (1994–1995)
 Eduardo Farah Hayn (1995–1998)
 Emilo Navarro Castañeda (1998–2000)
 Manuel Guillén Yzaga Salazar (2000–2002)
 Roberto Niesta Brero (2002–2004)
 George Schofield Bonello (2004–2006)
 Eduardo Farah Hayn (2006–2009)
 Pedro Carlos Olaechea Álvarez Calderón (2009–2012)
 Luis Salazar Steiger (2012–2015)
 Andreas von Wedemeyer Knigge (2015–2018)
 Ricardo Márquez Flores (2018–2022)
 Jesús Salazar Nishi (2022–2024)

References

See also 

 Confederación General de Trabajadores del Perú (CGTP)

Business organisations based in Peru